Thomas Adamson  (9 September 1845 – 29 December 1913) was a New Zealand yeoman soldier, awarded New Zealand Cross in 1876.

Life
Born in Wanganui, New Zealand in 1845, Adamson was celebrated for his skill and hardihood in bush scouting and warfare after the Maori manner, and was awarded the New Zealand Cross in recognition of several daring expeditions in Hauhau country. He served with Kepa's Wanganui Maori Contingent and in Whitmore's Corps of Guides 1869–70, and was wounded at Manawa-hiwi Urewera Country on 7 May 1869.

See also
 New Zealand Cross

References

1845 births
1913 deaths
New Zealand farmers
New Zealand military personnel
Recipients of the New Zealand Cross (1869)
People of the New Zealand Wars
People from Whanganui